Michael Wayne is a Canadian historian of the United States at the University of Toronto. He is a senior fellow at University College. As an undergraduate, Wayne studied at the University of Toronto and Amherst College. He received his PhD from Yale University where he studied under C. Vann Woodward.

Wayne writes primarily about the American South and race relations in the United States. His major works include The Reshaping of Plantation Society: The Natchez District, 1860–1880  dealing, in part, with impact of Sharecropping and intermarriage between the White elite, Death of an Overseer: Reopening a Murder Investigation from the Plantation South, and Imagining Black America. An Old South Morality Play: Reconsidering the Social Underpinnings of the Proslavery Ideology  challenged popular views of class structure in the slaveholding South. The Reshaping of Plantation Society won the 1983 Saloutos Book Award of the Agricultural History Society.   In The black population of Canada West on the eve of the American Civil War: A reassessment based on the manuscript census of 1861 he disputes the narrative that the typical Black resident of the Canadian West were fugitive slaves. 

He also wrote a satirical novel dealing with the follies of academia and the peculiarities of Canadian and American identities; titled Lincoln's Briefs, it has been published by Canadian Scholars' Press.

Michael Wayne is the son of Johnny Wayne, who was a member of the Canadian comedy duo Wayne and Shuster.

Nonfiction books

The Reshaping of Plantation Society: The Natchez District, 1860–1880

Death of an Overseer: Reopening a Murder Investigation from the Plantation South 

Imagining Black America. An Old South Morality Play: Reconsidering the Social Underpinnings of the Proslavery Ideology

See also
Natchez Mississippi

References

Year of birth missing (living people)
Living people
21st-century Canadian historians
Canadian male non-fiction writers
Historians of the United States
Academic staff of the University of Toronto
Yale University alumni